Professor Kersti Börjars (born 1960) is a linguist who is Master of St Catherine's College, Oxford.

Education 
Börjars was educated in Sweden at Uppsala University (Filosofie Kandidat), and then in the Netherlands at the University of Leiden (Doctorandus) before completing a PhD at the University of Manchester.

Academic career 
Since 1994, Börjars has been a member of staff at the University of Manchester, where she was promoted to professor in 2002. During 2002, she was a visiting professor at Göteborg University, and she is currently a professor at the University of Oslo.

From 2004 to 2008 Börjars was Associate Dean for Undergraduate Affairs in the Faculty of Humanities. Börjars was Head of School of Languages, Linguistics and Cultures from 2009 until 2012. until 2019 she was Associate Vice-President for Teaching, Learning and Students.

Since January 2020 she has been Master of St Catherine's College, Oxford.

Börjars was the President of the Linguistics Association of Great Britain from 2005 until 2011. She is the editor of the Journal of Linguistics. Since January 2017, she has been a professor in Nordic Languages at the University of Oslo.

References

External links
 Staff profile at the University of Manchester

Uppsala University alumni
Leiden University alumni
Masters of St Catherine's College, Oxford
Living people
1960 births
Academics of the University of Manchester